The Pendleton Round-Up is a major annual rodeo in the northwestern United States, at Pendleton in northeastern Oregon. Held at the Pendleton Round-Up Stadium during the second full week of September each year since 1910, the rodeo brings roughly 50,000 people every year to the city.  The Pendleton Round-Up is a member of the Professional Rodeo Cowboys Association (PRCA). The ProRodeo Hall of Fame in Colorado Springs, Colorado, inducted the Pendleton Round-Up in 2008.

The Round-Up was incorporated as a 501(c)(4) not-for-profit organization on July 29, 1910, as the "Northwestern Frontier Exhibition Association". The rodeo was primarily a creation of local ranchers led by Herman Rosenberg.

The Pendleton Round-Up has won the PRCA Large Outdoor Rodeo of the Year award seven times: 2003, 2010, 2015, 2016, 2017, 2018, and 2019.

Bronc rider Bonnie McCarroll (1897–1929) died in a rodeo accident at Pendleton. The PRCA, formed in 1936, initially scheduled no events for women as a result of her death.

History 
The first Pendleton Round-up was held in 1910, born of a "communistic" desire to establish a city park for Pendleton. It was an immediate success, and grew in scale dramatically in each of its first several years.

The only cancellations happened in 1943, 1944 (both due to World War II), and 2020 (due to the COVID-19 pandemic).

Events
There are 11 events in which cowboys (and girls in Barrel Racing and Breakaway Roping) from all over the United States and Canada compete. The All-Around Cowboy is awarded to the competitor who wins the most money in the required number of events.

Round-Up week
Every Round-Up week begins with the Dress Up Parade, on the Saturday before the rodeo, in which different groups throughout Eastern Oregon, including Boy and Girl Scouts, Pendleton High School Band, the Children's Rodeo, and many local businesses, build floats and compete for 1st place.

After the parade is when vendors start rolling in! There is vendors from food vendors to clothing vendors and all other sorts of vendors! There's also a huge carnival that comes into town! 

The Happy Canyon Indian Pageant and Wild West Show was designated the state's official outdoor pageant in 2017.

Friday of Round-Up week is the Westward Ho! parade, in which every entrant must be in a non-motorized vehicle, most of which are authentic covered wagons and horse-drawn buggies, though some choose to ride horseback or walk.

The Monday and Tuesday before the rodeo begins, the PRCA Xtreme Bulls Tour Finale takes place in the Happy Canyon Arena.

Wednesday is when both Round-Up and Happy Canyon begin.

Grand entry

The rodeo starts with an extreme run in on horseback of flag bearers; the Flag of the United States, the Flag of Oregon, the Flag of Canada, and the flag of the Confederated Tribes of the Umatilla Indian Reservation, then the Round-Up Queen and her court run in on their horses at full speed, make two jumps and stop just before the fence in front of the south grandstand.

Personnel
The current announcer of the Pendleton Round-Up is Wayne Brooks, while the bullfighters are Dusty Tuckness and Tim O'Conner.

Grand Final Review

See also
Let 'er Buck (1925)
Pendleton Round-Up and Happy Canyon Hall of Fame
Last Go Round

References

External links

 Official Website
 History of the Pendleton Round-Up
 Audio slideshow of a 97-year-old ex-Pendleton rodeo clown
 Happy Canyon an Indian Pageant that is part of the Roundup
 "Oh you round up let 'er buck" Official song of the 1912 Round Up - Sheet music and photographs
 Pendleton Round-Up Documentary produced by Oregon Public Broadcasting

1910 establishments in Oregon
Annual events in Oregon
Festivals in Oregon
Organizations based in Oregon
Pendleton, Oregon
Recurring events established in 1910
Rodeos
Tourist attractions in Umatilla County, Oregon
Festivals established in 1910
ProRodeo Hall of Fame inductees
Rodeo venues in the United States